United States gubernatorial elections were held in 1800, in 11 states, concurrent with the House, Senate elections and presidential election.

Six governors were elected by popular vote and five were elected by state legislatures.

Results

See also 
1800 United States elections
1800 United States presidential election
1800–01 United States Senate elections
1800–01 United States House of Representatives elections

References

Notes

Bibliography